It Takes Two may refer to:

Film
It Takes Two (1982 film), a Hong Kong film directed by Karl Maka
It Takes Two (1988 film), an American comedy directed by David Beaird
It Takes Two (1995 film), an American comedy starring Mary-Kate and Ashley Olsen

Music

Albums
It Takes Two (album) or the title song (see below), by Rob Base and DJ E-Z Rock, 1988
It Takes Two, by Soulsister, 1988

Songs
"It Takes Two" (Marvin Gaye and Kim Weston song), 1966
"It Takes Two" (Rob Base and DJ E-Z Rock song), 1988
"It Takes Two", by Katy Perry from Prism
"It Takes Two", from the musical Hairspray
"It Takes Two", from the musical Into the Woods

Television

Series
It Takes Two (American TV series), a 1982 sitcom starring Richard Crenna and Patty Duke
It Takes Two (Australian TV series), a 2006 version of the UK celebrity singing series Just the Two of Us
It Takes Two (Singaporean TV series), a 2012 Chinese-language drama
It Takes Two (game show), a 1969 American game show
Strictly Come Dancing: It Takes Two, a UK programme 2004–present

Episodes
"It Takes Two" (Desperate Housewives)
"It Takes Two" (Make It or Break It)
"It Takes Two" (RuPaul's Drag Race All Stars)
"It Takes Two" (Smart Guy)

Other uses
"It Takes Two" (story), a 2009 science fiction story by Nicola Griffith
It Takes Two (video game), a 2021 action-adventure game developed by Hazelight Studios

See also
 Take Two (disambiguation)